This is a list of the municipalities in the region of El Bierzo in the province of León,  autonomous community of Castile and León, Spain.

See also

Geography of Spain
List of cities in Spain

Municipalities in El Bierzo
El Bierzo